The Malaysia League XI, commonly known as  MSL All Stars, Malaysia Selection or Malaysia League Selection represents Malaysia Super League in friendly matches. Malaysia League XI mainly play non-FIFA 'A' international matches while the competitive matches such as FIFA World Cup qualifications and the AFC Asian Cup are played by the Malaysia national team.

History 
The Malaysia League XI is formed by the top players in the Malaysia Super League. Some of the players are mainly from the Malaysia national team. Malaysia League XI usually plays against football clubs throughout the world mostly from England.

In recent years, Football Association of Malaysia has always arranged matches between the Malaysian side and clubs throughout the world. Malaysia League XI doesn't play a match for a few years. They only play a match if they are invited to. The team mainly play against a pre-season match for the opposite team to be prepared for their leagues. Malaysia League XI only recorded four wins and four draws since their match at 1962.

Fixtures and results

Players

Current squad 
The following players were called up for the friendly matches against  Albirex Niigata Singapore, on 28 March 2022.
Caps and goals are correct as of 26 March 2022 after the match against Singapore with national senior team.

Head-to-head records 

*Denotes draws include knockout matches decided on penalty kicks.

Notes and references

Notes

References

External links 
 

Football in Malaysia
Malaysia Super League
Representative teams of association football leagues